Acanthocolpidae is a family of trematodes belonging to the order Plagiorchiida.

Genera

Genera:
 Acaenodera Manter & Pritchard, 1960
 Acanthocolpus Lühe, 1906
 Critovitellarium Vigueras, 1955

References

Plagiorchiida